Recep Çetin (born 1 October 1965 in Karasu) is a Turkish footballer whose career as a defender lasted from 1979 to 2002.

Career
A native of the town of Karasu in the Marmara Region's Sakarya Province, Recep Çetin began his football career in 1979 at the age of 14 as a youth trainee in the Sakaryaspor football club, where he remained upon turning professional at 19 in 1984. He joined  Boluspor in 1984. He was upset due to his team relegated to second level after placing last in the table in 1984-85 season. However, he won Second League championship at Group B and returned to top level in 1985-86 season. Transferring to Beşiktaş J.K. in 1988, he was selected to play for the Turkey national football team 56 times and played 10 seasons in Beşiktaş. He won 4 league titles, 3 Turkish Cups, 4 President's Cups, 2 Prime Minister's Cups and 5 TSYD Cup championships. Upon leaving Beşiktaş he transferred to Trabzonspor in 1998 and then to İstanbulspor in 1999, ultimately retiring in 2001.

Known for his versatile playing style, defensive strength, and charismatic looks, he was nicknamed "Takoz Recep". His goal against Switzerland elevated Takoz to legend status. He remains a football icon in Turkey with a cult following.

Career statistics

International goals

Individual
Beşiktaş J.K. Squads of Century (Silver Team)

References

1965 births
Living people
People from Karasu
Turkish footballers
UEFA Euro 1996 players
Turkey international footballers
Turkey youth international footballers
İstanbulspor footballers
Trabzonspor footballers
Beşiktaş J.K. footballers
Sakaryaspor footballers
Boluspor footballers
Süper Lig players
Association football defenders